Ferenc Szabó can refer to:

 Ferenc Szabó (composer) (1902-1969), Hungarian composer
 Ferenc Szabó (footballer) (1921-2009), Hungarian footballer
 Ferenc Szabó (judoka) (born 1948), Hungarian Olympic judoka
 Károly Ferenc Szabó (1943-2011), Romanian politician